Diplacaspis is a genus of warty leaf beetles in the  family Chrysomelidae. There are at least three described species in Diplacaspis.

Species
These three species belong to the genus Diplacaspis:
 Diplacaspis chlamysoides Monros
 Diplacaspis pectoralis Monros
 Diplacaspis prosternalis (Schaeffer, 1906)

References

Further reading

 
 

Cryptocephalinae
Articles created by Qbugbot
Chrysomelidae genera